Free Press was a short-lived but well-attempted and widely circulated, monthly magazine in Malayalam language published from Delhi between 2003 and 2006. At 23, Vinod K. Jose became one of the youngest editors-in-chief of any current affairs registered magazine in India when he started Free Press. Free Press was the first publication to have initiated the concept of citizen journalism in Kerala.

Free Press was founded by Vinod Jose, while working as a foreign correspondent in South Asia for the United States based Pacifica Radio. Funding itself on readers' contribution, Free Press exhibited the idealism of a group of twenty young journalists, who came together to publish an investigative, non-partisan monthly in Malayalam published from Delhi, targeting the Malayalis in Kerala and the Malayali diaspora in other Indian states and abroad.  Free Press was a registered magazine with the Registrar of Newspapers for India (RNI) and sold 55,000 copies every month. Without spending any money on advertisement, Free Press gained the circulation through word-of-mouth campaign and conducting smaller events in Kerala.

Free Press investigations included: Reliance corporation and its contribution to India's black economy, fake-encounter epidemic by Delhi Police, Intel meddling with the school curriculum in Kerala, industrialists "buying" rivers in Kerala, sex scandal of a Muslim League minister in Kerala. And the result was quick. Its office was raided. The editor was interrogated.  Reporters were harassed and the distribution system was destroyed. Printing presses in Delhi were forced to back off. Free Press in 2005 was forced out of newsstands.

In May 2006, Vinod K. Jose, editor-in-chief; V.H. Nishad, literary editor; V.M. Shaijith, the political editor declared in a public announcement that the magazine could not sustain itself anymore and declared its closure.

References

External links
 Registrar of Newspapers in India (Vinod K. Jose's entry for the Free Press
Human Rights Kerala

2003 establishments in Delhi
2006 disestablishments in India
Defunct magazines published in India
Monthly magazines published in India
News magazines published in India
Malayalam-language magazines
Magazines established in 2003
Magazines disestablished in 2006
Mass media in Kerala